Gunmetal Gray is the sixth novel by Mark Greaney, published on February 14, 2017 by Berkley Books. It is also the sixth book in the Gray Man series. Picking up after the events of Back Blast, Court Gentry, back in the employ of the Central Intelligence Agency after five years as a fugitive, has to capture a rogue hacker working for the Chinese military who is on the run from his former employers. The book was dedicated to prominent thriller writer Dalton Fury, who died in 2016. The novel debuted at number 10 at The New York Times Bestseller list.

Plot summary 
For his first operation back with the Central Intelligence Agency, Court Gentry is tasked with capturing Fan Jiang, a former member of PLA Unit 61398, an ultra-secret computer warfare unit responsible for testing China's own security systems, through his former handler Sir Donald Fitzroy, who was contracted by the Chinese government for a similar operation, in Hong Kong. Unbeknownst to him, his arrival in the country was discovered by the Ministry of State Security (MSS), who then sent two agents to surveil him. Their principal boss from the Ministry of Defense (MOD), Colonel Dai Longhai, becomes frustrated about this routine surveillance op and orders them to eliminate Gentry, who instead manages to kill them.

After the attempt on his life, Gentry decides to go dark in order to go on with his operation. His later inquiries on the whereabouts of Fitzroy attracted Colonel Dai's attention, who then ordered his henchmen to kidnap Gentry. Court is then brought to Fitzroy, who also had been kidnapped by Colonel Dai. Sir Donald had dispatched two kill teams for Fan on behalf of Colonel Dai's MOD, but they were killed by the Wo Shing Wo, a part of the Triad criminal organization in Hong Kong whom Fan had hired for protection while on the run. After hearing of his failure, Colonel Dai takes Fitzroy hostage and has decided to supervise the hunt. Aware of his reputation as the Gray Man and his past relationship with Fitzroy, but unaware that Gentry is working on behalf of the CIA, Colonel Dai hires Court to find Fan and eliminate him.

Gentry follows up on the last lead on Fan, in which the hacker had escaped the city by ship in the island of Po Toi with the help of Wo Shing Wo. After a violent bar fight, he finds out that Fan had in fact escaped to Vietnam and is now under the protection of the Con Ho Hoang Da (Wild Tigers), a Vietnamese criminal organization. Unbeknownst to him, a secret Russian foreign intelligence (SVR) paramilitary unit led by intelligence officer Zoya Zakharova was also interested in locating Fan, and had in fact located the ship first after having raided it. They also gleaned the same information from interrogating the ship's captain at the same time that Court found out about Fan's whereabouts.

Court, as well as Zoya's team, goes to Vietnam to continue his hunt. He plans to infiltrate the Wild Tigers's known headquarters in Ho Chi Minh City in order to capture Fan. However, an impatient Colonel Dai sends a paramilitary force to the HQ in an attempt to capture Fan without consulting Court, leaving Gentry to give chase to a black sedan (which, unbeknownst to him, was carrying Wild Tigers leader Tu Van Duc) escaping from the building into a Wild Tigers compound near the Cambodian border. 

However, Zoya's team was one step ahead of Gentry once again, as she determined the compound to be Fan's hiding place from interrogating a Vietnamese police officer who was on the Wild Tigers's payroll. Her team infiltrate the compound that night, which turned into a full scale gunfight with the Wild Tigers, as well as soldiers from the People's Army of Vietnam (PAVN) who were there as extra protection for Fan. Court eventually finds Fan trying to escape the compound with Tu Van Duc and one of his henchmen, and captures him while killing his protectors, but not before evading the Russian paramilitary unit trying to extract the hacker and kill him in the process.

After the attack on the compound, which had failed to capture Fan once again and killed one of her men, Zoya was recalled to Moscow for seemingly ordering her men to storm the compound even though they were outnumbered by PAVN forces (although she was not really supervising the operation; Vasily, the team leader of the SVR Zaslon paramilitary unit, ordered the raid). Now desperate and wanting to salvage her mission on her own, Zoya tries to recruit the services of the Chamroon Syndicate, a Thai criminal organization, but is later burned by the SVR for not reporting in to her employers sooner.

Meanwhile, while making their way to Cambodia, Fan tells Court why he defected from China. When his parents died in a car accident, leaving him with no family members and making him liable to be executed according to the "family collateral" rule among members of unit 61398 (hackers with no next of kin are deemed untrustworthy by the government), Fan was helped by his parents's guardian Song Julong, later deduced by Court to be a double agent working for the CIA, in defecting from China. He originally wanted to go to Taiwan through Hong Kong with Taiwanese papers provided by a contact of Song's, but he was left behind in the border when Colonel Dai's men chased him. Court finds out that he did not know the full story about his mission.

Court and Fan were captured soon after by river bandits, whom Fan deduced were Thai smugglers. Court was forced to leave Fan behind when he escaped, but he was rescued by the United States Navy in lieu of his CIA handler Suzanne Brewer. Court decides to go to Bangkok, Thailand to resume his search for Fan and prevent Sir Fitzroy from getting killed by the Colonel Dai, who had tortured Fitzroy and was by now getting desperate.

The CIA intercepts an encrypted message from Fan to Taiwanese authorities which reveals that he is under captivity from the Chamroon Syndicate, which has its headquarters in Bangkok. Court tries to capture one of its operational leaders, Nattapong Chamroon, in a nightclub, and then interrogate him on Fan's whereabouts. He informs Colonel Dai of his operation, who then sends some of his men to the club. Unfortunately, the Russian paramilitary team (now led by SVR operations officer Oleg Utkin) is also present with the same objective. Once again impatient, Colonel Dai orders his men, led by his second in command Major Xi, to storm the nightclub in pursuit of Fan and Chamroon's senior leadership. Major Xi's men find themselves in a violent gunfight with the Thai gangsters and Oleg's forces. Meanwhile, Court manages to rescue Chamroon from the gunfight as well as his five surviving call girls. However, the last call girl he saves turns out to be Zoya, who then takes the Thai gangster away from Court.

Zoya then presses Chamroon for Fan's whereabouts, and when he told her that his brother Kulap is with the hacker, she kills him and then exits the nightclub, where she then makes contact with her surviving paramilitary team and escapes the nightclub with them. In the car, Zoya and Utkin argue about the failed operation, but when Utkin tried to kill the burned SVR operative, Zoya kills him. Meanwhile, Court had found Chamroon's dead body and had also exited the nightclub. He then finds Zoya tending to his former teammates, and follows them using a tracking device. After hearing of her colleague's death, he captures her, but then decides to enlist her help in finding Fan.

Zoya and Court go to the island of Phuket, Thailand, where the Chamroon estate is located. The two get close over the course of two days surveilling the estate, and Court recruits Zoya into the CIA as an asset. Meanwhile, his handler Brewer informs him that Fan had sent an encrypted message, this time to the U.S. embassy in Bangkok, asking to be rescued from the Chamroon estate, and that CIA Ground Branch operatives are supervising his rescue instead of Court. Rather, Court would take charge of Zoya. After his call, however, Zoya and Court are kidnapped by Major Xi's men under orders from Colonel Dai, who is also in Phuket. They were put in a ranch house, where the colonel tells Court that he himself will supervise the attack into the Chamroon estate, and that he and his Russian girlfriend will stay behind until the operation is over. Fitzroy was also present in the house, and he tells Gentry that he was originally contracted by the MI6 to assassinate Song before he kills Fan's parents, but the kill team he sent spooked Song in Shanghai, leading him to kill Fan's parents in order to force the hacker's defection to the United States.

Court reveals his identity as the Gray Man to Zoya. Then they deduce that the encrypted e-mail from Fan is a red herring, since they both know that the hacker truly wanted to go to Taiwan instead of being rescued by the United States. They further conclude that Kulap Chamroon forced Fan to send the encrypted e-mail from a nearby yacht, which he later learns is owned by Italian crime syndicate 'Ndrangheta which has business ties to Kulap, in order to lead the Chinese into an ambush as revenge for his brother's death. They later escape the ranch house, leaving Fitzroy behind, and decide to infiltrate the yacht and rescue Fan themselves. Court had made contact with Brewer and tells her to abort the CIA Ground Branch's impending raid on the estate, which would have led to a violent gun battle between them and Colonel Dai's forces as well as an ambush from Chamroon's men. Meanwhile, Colonel Dai's men were brutally ambushed by Thai insurgents hired by Kulap in his own estate.

After rescuing Fan, Court calls Colonel Dai and arranges for a prisoner exchange with Fan and Fitzroy. However, Court decides to go off grid with Fan, and leaves Zoya to be rescued by the CIA. Days later, Court contacts his boss in the CIA, Matthew Hanley, who confirms his suspicions about his operation. Then, Hanley calls in the CIA Ground Branch team to try to extract Gentry from where he is calling, which is in a hotel in Phang Nga, Thailand. However, the paramilitary unit end up rescuing Fitzroy from Colonel Dai's men, killing Major Xi in the process.

Three days later, Court enlists Fitzroy's help in securing Fan's move to Taiwan. However, when Court sends Fan off to Taiwanese intelligence officers in an airport, they were both captured by the CIA Ground Branch team. After being whisked into the plane, Court then finds out that Fan will be forced to work for the United States since he is safer with them, and that Colonel Dai made a deal with the CIA to escape death in the hands of the Chinese military for failing to capture Fan. After meeting with Zoya in Frankfurt, Germany before she gets shipped off in order to be vetted into the CIA, Court goes off grid.

Characters 
 Courtland "Court" Gentry: The Gray Man, code name Violator — freelance assassin/contract agent for the Central Intelligence Agency
 Matthew Hanley: Director of the National Clandestine Service, Central Intelligence Agency
 Suzanne Brewer: Officer, National Clandestine Service, Central Intelligence Agency
 Fan Jiang: Chief Sergeant Class 3, cyber intrusion specialist, People’s Liberation Army, Unit 61398 (Red Cell Detachment), 2nd Bureau, General Staff Department (3rd Department)
 Dai Longhai: Colonel, department director of security and counterintelligence, People’s Liberation Army, 2nd Bureau, General Staff Department (3rd Department)
 Xi: Major, counterintelligence officer, People’s Liberation Army, 2nd Bureau, General Staff Department (3rd Department)
 Sir Donald Fitzroy: Director and CEO of Cheltenham Security Services; former handler of Court Gentry
 Zoya Feodorova Zakharova: Code name Banshee — officer, Russian Foreign Intelligence Service (SVR)
 Oleg Utkin: Code name Fantom — officer, Russian Foreign Intelligence Service (SVR)
 Vasily: “Anna One” — paramilitary officer and team leader, Russian Foreign Intelligence Service (SVR), Zaslon (Shield) Unit
 Tu Van Duc: Leader of Con Ho Hoang Da (Wild Tigers), Vietnam-based criminal organization
 Bui Ton Tan: Officer, Vietnam People’s Police and employee of Con Ho Hoang Da
 Kulap Chamroon: Co-leader of the Chamroon Syndicate, Thailand-based transnational crime syndicate
 Nattapong Chamroon: Brother of Kulap, co-leader of the Chamroon Syndicate, Thailand-based transnational crime syndicate
 Song Julong: Major and security officer, People’s Liberation Army, People’s Republic of China

Reception

Commercial 
Gunmetal Gray debuted at number 10 at the Combined Print & E-Book Fiction category of the New York Times bestseller list, as well as number 11 at the Hardcover Fiction category of the same list. This is the first time a Gray Man novel has charted in the list.

Critical 
The book received generally positive reviews. In a starred review, Kirkus Reviews praised the novel as "fat, fast, and fun". Carol Memmott of The Washington Post said: "Fans of RPG, Hong Kong action films and high-octane storytelling will love the Gray Man, who battles full-bore through this fast-paced series." In a starred review, Publishers Weekly hailed the novel as "outstanding" and added that "Gray Man fans will close the book happily fulfilled and eagerly awaiting his next adventure." Prominent literary reviewer The Real Book Spy remarked: "From start to finish, Gunmetal Gray impresses with a well-laid-out plot and enough action to satisfy even the pickiest thriller fans. Between the Clancy books and the Gray Man series, nobody is on a hotter streak right now than Mark Greaney."

References

The Gray Man
2017 American novels
American thriller novels
Berkley Books books